The 2023 AFC Asian Cup will be the 18th edition of the AFC Asian Cup, the quadrennial international men's football championship of Asia organised by the Asian Football Confederation (AFC). It will involve 24 national teams after expansion in 2019, with Qatar as the defending champions.

The tournament was originally scheduled to be held in China from 16 June to 16 July 2023. On 14 May 2022, the AFC announced that China would not host the tournament due to the circumstances caused by the COVID-19 pandemic and China's Zero-COVID policy.

On 17 October, the AFC announced that the tournament will be held in Qatar. Qatar will become the first country to host three Asian Cups, after 1988 and 2011. Due to the high summer temperatures in the Gulf region and Qatar's participation in the 2023 CONCACAF Gold Cup, the tournament will be postponed to 12 January – 10 February 2024.

Host selection

China was announced as the winning bid on 4 June 2019, on the eve of the 69th FIFA Congress in Paris, France. However, due to China's relinquishment of its hosting rights, the AFC conducted a second round of bidding, with a deadline for submissions scheduled on 17 October 2022.

Four nations had submitted bids: Australia, Indonesia, Qatar and South Korea, but Australia subsequently withdrew in September 2022 and Indonesia on 15 October. On 17 October, the AFC announced that Qatar won the bid and will host the tournament.

Teams

The first two rounds of qualification also served as the Asian qualification for the World Cup. Qatar participated only in the second round solely for qualification for the 2023 Asian Cup. They had qualified automatically for the World Cup as host nation. China too participated only in the second round. They had initially qualified automatically for the Asian Cup as host nation.

Timor-Leste were barred from participating in the qualification tournament. The team was found to have fielded a total of twelve ineligible players in 2019 AFC Asian Cup qualification matches, among other competitions. However, as FIFA did not bar them from the 2022 FIFA World Cup qualifiers, Timor-Leste were still allowed to enter the competition, but were ineligible to qualify for the Asian Cup.

Qualifying began on 6 June 2019 for 23 spots joining the then-chosen host nation China. North Korea withdrew from the qualifying round due to safety concerns related to the COVID-19 pandemic.

Qualified teams

Draw
The draw will be held in Katara Opera House in Doha on 11 May 2023.

Venues
Five host cities were submitted in the 2023 bid, including seven stadiums prepared for the 2022 FIFA World Cup. The Lusail Stadium was proposed to host the final and a semi-final, with the Al Bayt Stadium in Al Khor to host the other semi-final. However, the official stadiums for the tournament have not been announced yet.

Group stage
All times are local, AST (UTC+3).

Group A

Group B

Group C

Group D

Group E

Group F

Ranking of third-placed teams
The four best third-placed teams from the six groups advance to the knockout stage along with the six group winners and six runners-up.

Knockout stage

In the knockout stage, extra time and penalty shoot-out were used to decide the winner if necessary.

Bracket

Round of 16

Quarter-finals

Semi-finals

Final

Notes

See also
 2022 AFC Women's Asian Cup
 2022 AFC Futsal Asian Cup
 2023 AFC U-20 Asian Cup
 2023 AFC U-17 Asian Cup
 2023 CONCACAF Gold Cup

References

External links
 , the-AFC.com

 
2023
2024 in Asian football
2024 in Qatari sport
2023
January 2024 sports events in Asia
February 2024 sports events in Asia
Sports events affected by the COVID-19 pandemic
Scheduled association football competitions